The Ministry of Worship  is a ministry of the Government of Haiti. This ministry is responsible for playing an integral role in the Cabinet of the Prime Minister.

Government ministries of Haiti